Michal Grman may refer to:
 Michal Grman (footballer) (born 1993), Slovak football midfielder
 Michal Grman (ice hockey) (born 1982), Slovak ice hockey defenceman